Abuakwa is a small  town in the Atwima Nwabiagya District of the Ashanti Region.

Further reading 
OKYEMAN is a traditional area in the Eastern Region of Ghana. Historically, it has been attested that the AKYEMS were one of the first Akan tribes to migrate southwards after the fall of the ancient SONGHAI EMPIRE. The Akyem states, commonly known as “AKYEM MANSA”, consists of three main independent states, all grouped in the Eastern Region, with common language, culture, customs and historical background. The states are:

AKYEM ABUAKWA – the largest of the states in terms of land, size, population and natural resources.

AKYEM KOTOKU – the second largest.

AKYEM BOSOME – the smallest of the three.

References

See also
Adanwomase

Populated places in the Ashanti Region